Ciepielów  is a village in Poland, in southern part of the Mazovian Voivodeship. It is a capital of a gmina in the powiat of Lipsko, on the Iłżanka River, near Radom. In 1998 it had approximately 750 inhabitants and two minor construction materials plants. Ciepielów belongs to the historic province of Lesser Poland, and for centuries the village belonged to Sandomierz Voivodeship. It used to be a town from 1548 until 1870.

History
Ciepielów was founded by the Kazanowski family on the old trade route linking Sandomierz with Warsaw, at the ford at Iłżanka River, as the central point of their domain. Rotmistrz Marcin Kazanowski in 1548 was awarded by King Zygmunt August the right to grant the village with a city charter. In 1597 the town was granted with Magdeburg Law by Sigismund III Vasa and was allowed for creation of trade unions, which allowed it to become a notable centre of commerce in the area. However, before 1627 the town was totally destroyed by a major fire and Zygmunt Kazanowski relocated the city around that date. The town was also granted with a royal privilege of organization of markets once a week and fairs four times a year. In addition, Ciepielów was freed of all taxes and fees for 20 years, which allowed for a faster reconstruction.

Around 1770 Ciepielów was purchased by the Denhoff family and by 1780 it was transferred to Józef Karczewski, starost of Liw. Until 1869 the town had city rights and was a minor centre of trade and commerce in the area. However, the city charter was withdrawn as a repression against local inhabitants who took part in the failed January Uprising against Russia.

On September 8, 1939, after the Invasion of Poland, the village of Dąbrowa (near Ciepielów) was the site of a mass murder of approximately 300 Polish prisoners of war by German Wehrmacht troops. In December 1941, a minor ghetto was established in Ciepielów by German authorities; in October 1942 all of them (approximately 600) of them were sent to gas chambers of Treblinka extermination camp.

On December 6, 1942, in nearby villages Stary Ciepielów and Rekówka thirty-one Poles, among them women and children, were murdered for helping Jews. Also, two Jewish refugees were among the victims.

External links
 Commune of Ciepielów
 Jewish Community in Ciepielów on Virtual Shtetl

Villages in Lipsko County
Shtetls
Holocaust locations in Poland
Nazi war crimes in Poland